Jemimah Puddleduck was an American rock band led by Bob Weir & RatDog lead guitarist Mark Karan. In addition to Karan the band also included Billy Lee Lewis on drums, Bob Gross or Robin Sylvester on bass and John "JT" Thomas or Mookie Siegel on keyboards.

History
The band was formed in 1999 by Karan, drummer John Molo (Bruce Hornsby, Phil Lesh & Friends), bassist Bob Gross (Albert King) and keyboardist Arlan Schierbaum (Richie Kotzen). They released one self titled album in 2000. Since then, they have performed over 100 rare shows while members still maintain their separate touring careers. Schierbaum was replaced by John "JT" Thomas and the full band played on several songs on Mark Karan's debut solo album, Walk Through the Fire.

In 2009 John Molo was replaced on drums by Wally Ingram due to scheduling conflicts with Moonalice. Drummer Carlo Nuccio did a few dates in 2009.  In 2010 the band performed at the Nateva Festival, Furthur Festival, and several other smaller festivals around the US.

The band has not performed since 2011. On November 23, 2015 drummer Billy Lee Lewis died from cancer.

Discography
Jemimah Puddleduck (2000)
Walk Through the Fire - Mark Karan (2009) (tracks 1, 3, 10 and 11)

Notes

References

Budnick, Dean.  "Mark Karan's Menagerie: From Ratdog to Jemimah Puddleduck", JamBands.com, May 2000
Cook, Dennis. "A Fillmore Friday the 13th" (concert review), JamBase, February 22, 2004
Jemimah Puddleduck at JamBase
Jemimah Puddleduck at Blue Mountain Artists

External links
Mark Karan Official Site
Mark Karan's Facebook Page
Mark Karan on Twitter

Rock music groups from California
Jam bands